"Naked" is a song recorded by British singer and songwriter James Arthur. The song was released as a digital download on 24 November 2017 in the United Kingdom by Sony Music, as the lead single from his third studio album, You. The song has peaked at number 11 on the UK Singles Chart. The song was written by Max Martin, Savan Kotecha, James Arthur and Johan Carlsson, the song was produced by Carlsson.  As of 2021, it has sold 730,347 copies in the UK.

Music video
An official music video to accompany the release of "Naked" was first released onto YouTube on 1 December 2017 at a total length of four minutes and one second. The video was directed by Mario Clement.

Track listing

Charts

Weekly charts

Year-end charts

Certifications

See also
List of number-one songs of 2018 (Lebanon)

References

2017 singles
2017 songs
James Arthur songs
Songs written by James Arthur
Songs written by Max Martin
Songs written by Savan Kotecha
Songs written by Johan Carlsson (musician)
Sony Music UK singles
Pop ballads